Politicz is a studio album by the British rock artist Kevin Coyne which was released in 1982.

Reception
AllMusic's reviewer Dean McFarlane awarded the album 3 stars and said, "One of the British singer/songwriter's more outwardly experimental records, this album contains some of his most intimate work, deeply personal songs and techniques which were taking him further and further away from tradition."

Track listing

Personnel

Musicians
 Steve Bull - synthesizer
 Peter Kirtley - guitars
 Kevin Coyne - vocals
 Jim Woodland - backing vocals on "Tell The Truth"

Production personnel
 Producers: Kevin Coyne, Peter Kirtley and Steve Bull at Chestnut Studios, Farnham
 Engineer: Mike Gregovich
 Cover artwork: James Wolf

References

1982 albums
Kevin Coyne albums
Cherry Red Records albums